Danish Committee for Aid to Afghan Refugees (DACAAR) (Danish: Den danske komité for hjælp til afghanske flygtninge) is a non-political, non-governmental, non-profit humanitarian and development organization working to improve the lives of the Afghan people since 1984.

DACAAR work in rural areas and aim at improving rural livelihoods through sustainable activities that engage Afghan communities to be agents of their own development process.

DACAAR employ a holistic approach to all rural development activities in order to ensure long-term viability of projects.  Approximately 12 million Afghans across Afghanistan's 34 provinces have benefited from DACAARs humanitarian/developmental activities since the group was established in 1984.

History 
The Danish Committee for Aid to Afghan Refugees (DACAAR) was formed in 1984 to support the more than 5 million Afghans, who had fled to Pakistan and Iran and the 2 million, who were displaced within Afghanistan during the Soviet invasion. DACAAR was founded by the Danish Refugee Council (DRC), Danish People's Aid (DPA), Danish Association for International Co-operation (MS) and Caritas Denmark.

DACAAR started as a small sewing centre for Afghan women living as refugees in Peshawar, Pakistan in 1984. Two years later DACAAR started its first water supply programme for Afghan refugees in Khyber Pakhtunkhwa, North West Frontier Province (NWFP) in Pakistan. Over the next three years the programme was expanded to most of the camps in NWFP and included maintenance of water supply and water distribution systems. In 1989 the Soviet withdrew its troops from Afghanistan and DACAAR returned to Afghanistan to start up programmes in the rural areas. The main office remained in Peshawar, but over the coming years, field offices were gradually opened across Afghanistan.

In 1994 the Taliban took over control of most of Afghanistan and by 1996 all of DACAAR's activities were in Taliban controlled areas. DACAAR continued to work with the Afghan people, where it was possible. By the late 1990s DACAAR stopped its relief work to focus on development work in Afghan communities, involving the local people in the projects.

In late 2001 the Taliban regime was overthrown by allied forces and a new government was formed in Kabul. In November 2002 DACAAR moved its main office from Peshawar to Kabul, and in 2006 DACAAR stopped working in Pakistan to focus on its work in Afghanistan.

In 2007, further deterioration of the security situation in Afghanistan forced DACAAR to scale down and withdraw in some areas. Insecurity also created over 100,000 IDPs contributing to the large number of vulnerable people in need of support. Together with the recent waves of refugees returning to Afghanistan, this had a substantial impact on DACAAR's work, with increased activities in returnee and IDP settlements, particularly in the provision of safe water and basic sanitation.

In 2008, DACAAR continued to provide emergency assistance, such as water tankering to returnee and IDP camps, in addition to its ongoing projects in water supply and rural development. The introduction of a gender unit constitutes a significant development in DACAAR's efforts to promote gender mainstreaming both internally and externally. In addition, renewed emphasis was placed on project monitoring and evaluation to ensure the effectiveness, sustainability and long term impact of projects.

In 2009, solar-powered pipe schemes were introduced to enable water access in areas where hand pumps are unable to reach deep-seated aquifers. In places where surface water is the only option, or where ground water is contaminated by arsenic and heavy metals, DACAAR introduced bio-sand filters as a new household water treatment technology.

Despite a continually worsening security situation, DACAAR reached more than 2 million beneficiaries in 2010 with emphasis on vulnerable populations in rural areas. Capacity in natural resources management was strengthened among communities in semi-arid areas, with the introduction of new techniques and approaches to increase agricultural production. To enhance rural livelihoods for the vulnerable landless, DACAAR also prioritised small scale enterprise development and vocational training. DACAAR established a Water Expertise and Training Centre (WETC), as a hub for knowledge management and research as well as for training and technical support to government agencies, NGOs and the private sector. Through the WETC, DACAAR effectively used its extensive experience to accelerate capacity building. The WETC also includes a modern Drinking Water Quality Testing Laboratory that serves both DACAAR and the Afghan WASH sector as a whole.

Ongoing conflict and instability in 2011 continued to narrow the humanitarian space and hamper DACAAR's ability to deliver assistance to Afghanistan's most vulnerable and remote communities. Additionally, as with all conflict and post conflict nations, Afghanistan was still in the process of building necessary capacity to embark on a sustainable development process.

DACAAR continued to support these efforts as a facilitating partner in the NSP. In 10 out of the 12 provinces where DACAAR was working this year, activities included capacity building of Community Development Councils (CDCs). Rural Afghan communities with more than half a million community members were empowered to manage their own development process through training in project implementation, accounting, procurement, participatory monitoring, CDC by-laws and good governance.

A new Strategic Programme Framework for 2013-2016 was finalised in 2012 to set DACAAR's strategic direction for the four years. The merging of the two former programmes was consolidated with a thematic focus in four areas: Water, Sanitation & Hygiene; Natural Resources Management; Women's Empowerment; and Small Scale Enterprise Development. The aim was to improve learning and synergies across sectors in order to increase programme quality.

DACAAR also implemented a new organisational structure that was fine-tuned throughout the year to raise the overall efficiency of the organisation. The Director became the only expatriate in a line management position and all four departments (Fundraising & Communications; Programme; Finance & Administration; and Human Resources) were headed by Afghans.

In 2013 DACAAR was elected by ACBAR members to be on the Humanitarian Country Team (HCT).  Additionally, DACAAR was elected as Co-lead for the Afghan WASH Cluster.

As the stay of Pakistani tribal refugees in Khost become more protracted in 2015, DACAAR was one of the first organizations to deliver a vocational training course  as a longer-term intervention to improving the situation of these refugees as opposed to early programs that were only of emergency response nature.

In 2017, In response to the large scale displacements in the country, DACAAR expanded its geographical coverage for emergency WASH programme from 19 to 23 provinces.

Current Work 
DACAAR carries out a variety of emergency relief, early recovery and developmental interventions in Afghanistan. They tailor these to the needs and priorities of each targeted community, delivering interventions in an integrated way ensuring best outcomes for their beneficiaries.

The interventions fall within one of the following broad thematic areas:

Water, Sanitation and Hygiene 
DACAAR is one of the pioneering Water, Sanitation and Hygiene (WASH) organisations in Afghanistan, not only for introducing new technologies and approaches, but also through capacity building of this sector in the country.

They take Co-Lead in the Afghan WASH Cluster, and participates actively and regularly in Water Sector Group, Water Technical Working Group, and Hygiene & Sanitation Technical Working Groups.

Their WASH activities includes life-saving emergency response interventions, aimed at the early stages of a crisis and target recent internally displaced persons and returning refugees, and communities affected by conflicts and natural disasters. However, the bulk of their programs are aimed at ensuring durable access to safe drinking water and sustainable hygiene and sanitation behavioural change, as this is crucial in ensuring communities regain their dignity and resilience and embark on a journey of recovery and development.

DACAAR runs a Water Expertise and Training Centre that helps build the capacity of WASH implementers through conducting regular technical training workshops and action research and providing hands-on technical support to WASH partners. Their approach enables communities to operate and maintain their water supply systems over the long run.

Natural Resources Management 
DACAAR's Natural Resources Management (NRM) interventions are primarily agriculture and livestock focused and aim at improving productivity and production as a means to enhancing longer-term livelihoods and quality of life among vulnerable Afghan farmers and their families. These interventions are designed and implemented in accordance with the needs of each community and the geography they live in.

They help rehabilitate or reconstruct small-scale irrigation structures and build the capacity of farmers in community-based operation and maintenance ensuring improved and strong supply of water for farming. In areas where irrigation water is not available, they support farmers in dry-land farming. Introduction of drip irrigation techniques is another method they have been promoting in regions where irrigation water is scarce.

DACAAR primarily employ a Farmer Field School approach to our interventions. These practical farm-based schools bring together a group of farmers to engage in collective learning, experimentation and knowledge sharing over an entire agricultural season. They get updated knowledge and skills on farming best practices from specialists on demonstration plots. Upon graduation, farmers receive toolkits and materials to replicate their learning on own farms, while they receive follow up technical advice and support from DACAAR's specialists.

DACAAR have been one of the leading organisations in promoting saffron cultivation in Afghanistan. Saffron is a highly valuable cash crop, and have been important in the effort of stopping opium production. 

In western Afghanistan where many communities suffer from the moving sand phenomenon, DACAAR have been integrating community-based rangeland protection with agriculture and employment and business development activities. In this way they help communities not only improve their village-based livelihoods, but also protect and stabilise their rangelands in a sustainable manner.

Small Scale Enterprise Development 
DACAAR's Small-Scale Enterprise Development (SSED) interventions are aimed at promoting business development and employment opportunities among youth and farmers in Afghanistan through the delivery of Vocational Development Programs and establishment of Producer Associations.

These courses are market driven and centre-based. The subject for each course is based on a market-analysis to ensure they are in line with local demand, so graduates can find employment and/or start businesses in their local districts and towns. Each course, which trains up to 20 trainees for a period of up to 7 months, includes daily practice sessions to ensure maximum transfer of technical skills. In addition to the technical skills, trainees get basic literacy and numeracy, including necessary business management skills.

DACAAR provides each graduate trainee with a toolkit and the option for receiving a grant to start own business. They are further entitled to expert advice and support by DACAAR field trainers during the first six months of starting a business. Regular data collection and analysis from our vocational training graduates show that 90% of the graduates have successfully used the start-up grant to start small businesses in their local areas.

Between 2014 and 2017, have they successfully graduated close to 650 trainees (33% women) from their courses in 9 provinces of Afghanistan. They plan to train another 2,800 in 12 provinces by 2021.

Linked closely with the activities under Natural Resources Management component, DACAAR facilitate farmers to engage in collective value chain activities by supporting the establishment of Producer Associations. Each association brings together as many as 150 farmers to collectively engage in processing, packaging, branding and marketing of their products in the local markets. This gives the association members the ability to negotiate better market prices for their products, as opposed to if they engage the market individually.

Women’s Empowerment 
In addition to targeting women and girls as part of the Water, Sanitation and Hygiene, Natural Resource Management and Small-Scale Enterprise Development programmes, DACAAR carries out initiatives, exclusively, targeting women and girls to help increase Afghan women’s sphere of influence and livelihoods in the rural, peri-urban and urban areas of the country. The social interventions are implemented under the auspices of Women’s Resource Centres. Women’s Resource Centres are self-organised collectives creating opportunities for member women to participate in income-generating activities and targeted educational and capacity building programs. The centres serve as the primary vehicle for the Women’s Empowerment activities, allowing rural women to come together in a safe women-only environment, which is culturally accepted. The women train, learn, and develop leadership skills, engage in small businesses and income-generating activities, discuss, share insight and knowledge and support each other. Each Women’s Resource Centre provides an opportunity for more than 500 women to come together from five villages and their Community Development Councils. Leadership for the centre is democratically elected. Since 2004, DACAAR have facilitated the establishment of 49 Women’s Resource Centres with 30,000 members.

Given Afghanistan’s highly patriarchic society, it is not always possible to get the communities to agree to the idea of establishing a Women’s Resource Centre. In such instances, DACAAR's support is not discontinued but rather focused on individual vulnerable women, such as women who are heads of households, until such time when the community agrees to the idea of a centre.

Citizen’s Charter Afghanistan Programme 
In addition to the above mentioned areas, is DACAAR an implementing partner with the Citizen’s Charter Afghanistan Programme, that aims at helping poor communities to get a minimum level of services. Community Development Councils that were established as part of the now completed National Solidarity Program are used as the platform and partner for line agencies to plan, manage and improve local-level service delivery. The Citizens’ Charter aims to build united villages, urban communities and cities improving the relationship between the Government and its people and reducing poverty by providing basic services. DACAAR is the Facilitating Partner for 850 communities in the Eastern Provinces of Laghman, Kunar and Nuristan Provinces.

Geographical coverage 

DACAAR currently cover all of the 34 provinces of Afghanistan with their Emergency WASH projects and Supporting Rural Water Supply Program combined.  They implement longer term early recovery and developmental projects in 11 provinces of the country. They are having activities in the following cities:

East

Nangarhar, Laghman, Kunur and Noristan.

Central

Kabul, Kapisa, Parwan, Ghazni, Panjsher, Wardak, Bamyan, Khost, Logar, Paktia and Paktika.

North

Balkh, Kunduz, Takhar, Badakhshan, Baghlan, Samangan and Juzjan.

North-west

Faryab, Sar-e-Pol and Daikondi.

West

Heart, Farah, Nimroz, Badghis and Ghor.

South

Kandahar, Helmand, Urozgan and Zabul.

Sustainable Development Goals 

DACAAR is working on a majority of the UN's Sustainable Development Goals (SDG's). Their programmes contributes to the following goals:

(1) No Poverty, (2) Zero Hunger, (3) Good Health and Well-being, (4) Quality Education, (5) Gender Equality, (6) Clean Water and Sanitation, (8) Decent Work and Economic Growth, (10) Reducing Inequality, (11) Sustainable Cities and Communities, (16) Peace, Justice, and Strong Institutions, (17) Partnerships for the Goals.

Partners 

DACAAR has worked closely with the Agency Co-ordinating Body for Afghan Relief (ACBAR), the Ministry of Agriculture, Irrigation & Livestock, the Ministry of Rural Rehabilitation & Development and the Ministry of Women Affairs (MoWA). 

DACAAR receives funding from a wide range of donors, including Danish International Development Agency (DANIDA), the Royal Norwegian Ministry of Foreign Affairs, DFID and the European Commission among others.

See also 

 Danish Refugee Council
 Danish International Development Agency
 Afghan National Solidarity Programme

References

External links
Official website

Development charities based in Denmark
Foreign charities operating in Afghanistan
Afghan refugees
Afghanistan–Denmark relations
Afghan diaspora in Pakistan